The Bayer designation ρ Cancri (Rho Cancri) is shared by two stars in the constellation Cancer:

 55 Cancri (ρ1 Cnc) Right ascension  Declination 
 58 Cancri (ρ2 Cnc) Right ascension  Declination 

Cancri, Rho
Cancer (constellation)